Nederlandse Veiligheidsdienst was the largest Dutch private security firm between 1911 and 1999. Ernst van der Lee started the  organisation under the name Gecombineerde Nachtveiligheidsdienst (GNVD).

Merger

The Nederlandse Veiligheidsdienst was sold in 1999 to the Falck Group. Falck already owned Group 4 and Securicor these two companies merged to become Group 4 Securicor.  In 2004, the merger was only allowed by the Netherlands Competition Authority if parts of the company were sold to prevent a monopoly in the securities business. Falck Security & Services, was sold  to Facilicom. This resulted in  Nederlandse Veiligheidsdienst being renamed Trigion.

References

1911 establishments in the Netherlands
Dutch companies disestablished in 1999
Defunct companies of the Netherlands
Security companies of the Netherlands